Casa Verde may refer to:
 Subprefecture of Casa Verde, São Paulo
 Casa Verde (district of São Paulo)
 Casa Verde High School, a high school in Casa Grande, Arizona
 Casa Verde (Iron Guard), the building that served as headquarters for the Iron Guard, an interwar Romanian political movement.